In naval terminology, a destroyer is a fast, manoeuvrable, long-endurance warship intended to escort
larger vessels in a fleet, convoy, or battle group and defend them against powerful short-range attackers. They were originally developed in 1885 by Fernando Villaamil for the Spanish Navy as a defense against torpedo boats, and by the time of the Russo-Japanese War in 1904, these "torpedo boat destroyers" (TBDs) were "large, swift, and powerfully armed torpedo boats designed to destroy other torpedo boats". Although the term "destroyer" had been used interchangeably with "TBD" and "torpedo boat destroyer" by navies since 1892, the term "torpedo boat destroyer" had been generally shortened to simply "destroyer" by nearly all navies by the First World War.

Before World War II, destroyers were light vessels with little endurance for unattended ocean operations; typically, a number of destroyers and a single destroyer tender operated together. After the war, the advent of guided missiles allowed destroyers to take on the surface-combatant roles previously filled by battleships and cruisers. This resulted in larger and more powerful guided-missile destroyers more capable of independent operation.

At the start of the 21st century, destroyers are the global standard for surface-combatant ships, with only two nations (the United States and Russia) officially operating the heavier cruisers, with no battleships or true battlecruisers remaining. Modern guided-missile destroyers are equivalent in tonnage but vastly superior in firepower to cruisers of the World War II era, and are capable of carrying nuclear-tipped cruise missiles. The Chinese Type 055 destroyer has been described as a cruiser in some US Navy reports due to its size and armament.

Some NATO navies, such as the Canadian, French, Spanish, Dutch, and German, use the term "frigate" for their destroyers, which leads to some confusion.

After the Second World War, destroyers grew in size.  The American s had a displacement of 2,200 tons, while the Arleigh Burke class has a displacement of up to 9,600 tons, thus growing in size almost 340%.

Origins

The emergence and development of the destroyer was related to the invention of the self-propelled torpedo in the 1860s. A navy now had the potential to destroy a superior enemy battle fleet using steam launches to fire torpedoes. Cheap, fast boats armed with torpedoes called torpedo boats were built and became a threat to large capital ships near enemy coasts. The first seagoing vessel designed to launch the self-propelled Whitehead torpedo was the 33-ton  in 1876. She was armed with two drop collars to launch these weapons; these were replaced in 1879 by a single torpedo tube in the bow. By the 1880s, the type had evolved into small ships of 50–100 tons, fast enough to evade enemy picket boats.

At first, the threat of a torpedo-boat attack to a battle fleet was considered to exist only when at anchor, but as faster and longer-range torpedo boats and torpedoes were developed, the threat extended to cruising at sea. In response to this new threat, more heavily gunned picket boats called "catchers" were built, which were used to escort the battle fleet at sea. They needed significant seaworthiness and endurance to operate with the battle fleet, and as they inherently became larger, they became officially designated "torpedo-boat destroyers", and by the First World War were largely known as "destroyers" in English. The antitorpedo boat origin of this type of ship is retained in its name in other languages, including French, Italian, Portuguese, Czech, Greek (αντιτορπιλικό), Dutch and, up until the Second World War, Polish (now obsolete).

Once destroyers became more than just catchers guarding an anchorage, they were recognized to be also ideal to take over the offensive role of torpedo boats themselves, so they were also fitted with torpedo tubes in addition to their antitorpedo-boat guns. At that time, and even into World War I, the only function of destroyers was to protect their own battle fleet from enemy torpedo attacks and to make such attacks on the battleships of the enemy. The task of escorting merchant convoys was still in the future.

Early designs

An important development came with the construction of HMS Swift in 1884, later redesignated TB 81. This was a large (137 ton) torpedo boat with four 47 mm quick-firing guns and three torpedo tubes. At , while still not fast enough to engage enemy torpedo boats reliably, the ship at least had the armament to deal with them.

Another forerunner of the torpedo-boat destroyer (TBD) was the Japanese torpedo boat  (Falcon), built in 1885. Designed to Japanese specifications and ordered from the Isle of Dogs, London Yarrow shipyard in 1885, she was transported in parts to Japan, where she was assembled and launched in 1887. In her trials in 1889, Kotaka demonstrated that she could exceed the role of coastal defense, and was capable of accompanying larger warships on the high seas. The Yarrow shipyards, builder of the parts for Kotaka, "considered Japan to have effectively invented the destroyer".

The German aviso , launched in 1886, was designed as a "Torpedojäger" (torpedo hunter), intended to screen the fleet against attacks by torpedo boats.

Torpedo gunboat

The first vessel designed for the explicit purpose of hunting and destroying torpedo boats was the torpedo gunboat. Essentially very small cruisers, torpedo gunboats were equipped with torpedo tubes and an adequate gun armament, intended for hunting down smaller enemy boats. By the end of the 1890s, torpedo gunboats were made obsolete by their more successful contemporaries, the TBDs, which were much faster.

The gunboat was armed with torpedoes and designed for hunting and destroying smaller torpedo boats. Built of steel, Rattlesnake was unarmoured with the exception of a -inch protective deck. She was armed with a single 4-inch/25-pounder breech-loading gun, six 3-pounder QF guns and four  torpedo tubes, arranged with two fixed tubes at the bow and a set of torpedo-dropping carriages on either side. Four torpedo reloads were carried.

In the 1880s, the Chilean Navy ordered the construction of two  torpedo gunboats from the British shipyard Laird Brothers, which specialized in the construction of this type of vessel. The novelty is that one of these Almirante Lynch-class torpedo boats managed to sink the ironclad  with a self-propelled torpedoes in the Battle of Caldera Bay in 1891, thus surpassing its main function of hunting torpedo boats.

Fernando Villaamil, second officer of the Ministry of the Navy of Spain, designed his own torpedo gunboat to combat the threat from the torpedo boat. He asked several British shipyards to submit proposals capable of fulfilling these specifications. In 1885, the Spanish Navy chose the design submitted by the shipyard of James and George Thomson of Clydebank.  (Destroyer in Spanish) was laid down at the end of the year, launched in 1886, and commissioned in 1887. Some authors considered her as the first destroyer ever built.

She was armed with one  Spanish-designed Hontoria breech-loading gun, four  (6-pounder) Nordenfelt guns, two  (3-pdr) Hotchkiss cannons and two  Schwartzkopff torpedo tubes. The ship carried three torpedoes per tube. She carried a crew of 60.

In terms of gunnery, speed, and dimensions, the specialised design to chase torpedo boats and her high-seas capabilities, Destructor was an important precursor to the TBD.

Development of modern destroyers

Early torpedo gunboat designs lacked the range and speed to keep up with the fleet they were supposed to protect. In 1892, the Third Sea Lord, Rear Admiral John "Jacky" Fisher ordered the development of a new type of ships equipped with the then-novel water-tube boilers and quick-firing small-calibre guns.

They were armed with one 12-pounder gun and three 6-pounder guns, with one fixed 18-in torpedo tube in the bow plus two more torpedo tubes on a revolving mount abaft the two funnels. Later, the bow torpedo tube was removed and two more 6-pounder guns added, instead. They produced 4,200 hp from a pair of Thornycroft water-tube boilers, giving them a top speed of 27 knots, giving the range and speed to travel effectively with a battle fleet. In common with subsequent early Thornycroft boats, they had sloping sterns and double rudders.

The French navy, an extensive user of torpedo boats, built its first TBD in 1899, with the  torpilleur d'escadre. The United States commissioned its first TBD, Destroyer No. 1, in 1902, and by 1906, 16 destroyers were in service with the US Navy.

Subsequent improvements

Torpedo boat destroyer designs continued to evolve around the turn of the 20th century in several key ways. The first was the introduction of the steam turbine. The spectacular unauthorized demonstration of the turbine-powered  at the 1897 Spithead Navy Review, which, significantly, was of torpedo-boat size, prompted the Royal Navy to order a prototype turbine-powered destroyer,  of 1899. This was the first turbine warship of any kind, and achieved a remarkable  on sea trials. By 1910, the turbine had been widely adopted by all navies for their faster ships.

The second development was the replacement of the torpedo boat-style turtleback foredeck by a raised forecastle for the new s built in 1903, which provided better sea-keeping and more space below deck.

The first warship to use only fuel oil propulsion was the Royal Navy's TBD , after experiments in 1904, although the obsolescence of coal as a fuel in British warships was delayed by oil's availability.
In spite of all this variety, destroyers adopted a largely similar pattern. The hull was long and narrow, with a relatively shallow draft. The bow was either raised in a forecastle or covered under a turtleback; underneath this were the crew spaces, extending  to  the way along the hull. Aft of the crew spaces was as much engine space as the technology of the time would allow - several boilers and engines or turbines. Above deck, one or more quick-firing guns were mounted in the bows, in front of the bridge; several more were mounted amidships and astern. Two tube mountings (later on, multiple mountings) were generally found amidships.

Construction remained focused on putting the biggest possible engines into a small hull, though, resulting in a somewhat flimsy construction.

By 1910, the steam-driven displacement (that is, not hydroplaning) torpedo boat had become redundant as a separate type. Germany, nevertheless, continued to build such boats until the end of World War I, although these were effectively small coastal destroyers. In fact, Germany never distinguished between the two types, giving them pennant numbers in the same series and never giving names to destroyers. Ultimately, the term "torpedo boat" came to be attached to a quite different vessel – the very fast-hydroplaning, motor-driven motor torpedo boat.

Early use and World War I
Navies originally built TBDrs to protect against torpedo boats, but admirals soon appreciated the flexibility of the fast, multipurpose vessels that resulted. Vice-Admiral Sir Baldwin Walker laid down destroyer duties for the Royal Navy:
 Screening the advance of a fleet when hostile torpedo craft are about
 Searching a hostile coast along which a fleet might pass
 Watching an enemy's port for the purpose of harassing his torpedo craft and preventing their return
 Attacking an enemy fleet

Early destroyers were extremely cramped places to live, being "without a doubt magnificent fighting vessels... but unable to stand bad weather". During the Russo-Japanese War in 1904, the commander of the Imperial Japanese Navy TBD Akatsuki described "being in command of a destroyer for a long period, especially in wartime... is not very good for the health". Stating that he had originally been strong and healthy, he continued, "life on a destroyer in winter, with bad food, no comforts, would sap the powers of the strongest men in the long run. A destroyer is always more uncomfortable than the others, and rain, snow, and sea-water combine to make them damp; in fact, in bad weather, there is not a dry spot where one can rest for a moment."

The Japanese destroyer-commander finished with, "Yesterday, I looked at myself in a mirror for a long time; I was disagreeably surprised to see my face thin, full of wrinkles, and as old as though I were 50. My clothes (uniform) cover nothing but a skeleton, and my bones are full of rheumatism."

John C. Fremont, described her as "...a compact mass of machinery not meant to keep the sea nor to live in... as five-sevenths of the ship are taken up by machinery and fuel, whilst the remaining two-sevenths, fore and aft, are the crew's quarters; officers forward and the men placed aft. And even in those spaces are placed anchor engines, steering engines, steam pipes, etc. rendering them unbearably hot in tropical regions."

Early combat

The TBD's first major use in combat came during the Japanese surprise attack on the Russian fleet anchored in Port Arthur at the opening of the Russo-Japanese War on 8 February 1904.

Tsesarevich, the Russian flagship, had her nets deployed, with at least four enemy torpedoes "hung up" in them, and other warships were similarly saved from further damage by their nets.

While capital-ship engagements were scarce in World War I, destroyer units engaged almost continually in raiding and patrol actions.

Destroyers were involved in the skirmishes that prompted the Battle of Heligoland Bight, and filled a range of roles in the Battle of Gallipoli, acting as troop transports and as fire-support vessels, as well as their fleet-screening role. Over 80 British destroyers and 60 German torpedo boats took part in the Battle of Jutland, which involved pitched small-boat actions between the main fleets, and several foolhardy attacks by unsupported destroyers on capital ships. Jutland also concluded with a messy night action between the German High Seas Fleet and part of the British destroyer screen.

The threat evolved by World War I with the development of the submarine, or U-boat. The submarine had the potential to hide from gunfire and close underwater to fire torpedoes. Early-war destroyers had the speed and armament to intercept submarines before they submerged, either by gunfire or by ramming. Destroyers also had a shallow enough draft that they were difficult to hit with torpedoes.

The desire to attack submarines under water led to rapid destroyer evolution during the war. They were quickly equipped with strengthened bows for ramming, and depth charges and hydrophones for identifying submarine targets. While U-19 was only damaged, the next month,  successfully sank . The first depth-charge sinking was on 4 December 1916, when  was sunk by HMS Llewellyn.

The submarine threat meant that many destroyers spent their time on antisubmarine patrol. Once Germany adopted unrestricted submarine warfare in January 1917, destroyers were called on to escort merchant convoys. US Navy destroyers were among the first American units to be dispatched upon the American entry to the war, and a squadron of Japanese destroyers even joined Allied patrols in the Mediterranean. Patrol duty was far from safe; of the 67 British destroyers lost in the war, collisions accounted for 18, while 12 were wrecked.

At the end of the war, the state-of-the-art was represented by the British W class.

1918–1945

The trend during World War I had been towards larger destroyers with heavier armaments. A number of opportunities to fire at capital ships had been missed during the war, because destroyers had expended all their torpedoes in an initial salvo. The British V and W classes of the late war had sought to address this by mounting six torpedo tubes in two triple mounts, instead of the four or two on earlier models. The V and W classes set the standard of destroyer building well into the 1920s.

This was largely because, between their commissioning in 1920 and 1926, they retained the armament that they had while serving in the Italian Navy as scout cruisers (esploratori). When initially ordered by Romania in 1913, the Romanian specifications envisioned three 120 mm guns, a caliber which would eventually be adopted as the standard for future Italian destroyers. Armed with three 152 mm and four 76 mm guns after being completed as scout cruisers, the two warships were officially re-rated as destroyers by the Romanian Navy. The two Romanian warships were thus the destroyers with the greatest firepower in the world throughout much of the interwar period. As of 1939, when the Second World War started, their artillery, although changed, was still close to cruiser standards, amounting to nine heavy naval guns (five of 120 mm and four of 76 mm). In addition, they retained their two twin 457 mm torpedo tubes and two machine guns, plus the capacity to carry up to 50 mines.

The next major innovation came with the Japanese  or "special type", designed in 1923 and delivered in 1928. The design was initially noted for its powerful armament of six 5-inch (127 mm) guns and three triple torpedo mounts. The later  of 1931 further improved the torpedo armament by storing its reload torpedoes close at hand in the superstructure, allowing reloading within 15 minutes.

Most other nations replied with similar larger ships. The US  adopted twin 5-inch (127 mm) guns, and the subsequent  and es (the latter of 1934) increased the number of torpedo tubes to 12 and 16, respectively.

In the Mediterranean, the Italian Navy's building of very fast light cruisers of the  prompted the French to produce exceptional destroyer designs. The French had long been keen on large destroyers, with their  of 1922 displacing over 2,000 tons and carrying 130 mm guns; a further three similar classes were produced around 1930.

Germany started to build destroyers again during the 1930s as part of Hitler's rearmament program. The Germans were also fond of large destroyers, but while the initial Type 1934 displaced over 3,000 tons, their armament was equal to smaller vessels. This changed from the Type 1936 onwards, which mounted heavy  guns. German destroyers also used innovative high-pressure steam machinery; while this should have helped their efficiency, it more often resulted in mechanical problems.

Once German and Japanese rearmament became clear, the British and American navies consciously focused on building destroyers that were smaller, but more numerous than those used by other nations. These ships displaced 1,850 tons and were armed with eight  guns in four twin turrets and four torpedo tubes. These were followed by the J-class and L-class destroyers, with six  guns in twin turrets and eight torpedo tubes.

Antisubmarine sensors included sonar (or ASDIC), although training in their use was indifferent. Antisubmarine weapons changed little, and ahead-throwing weapons, a need recognized in World War I, had made no progress.

Later combat

During the 1920s and 1930s, destroyers were often deployed to areas of diplomatic tension or humanitarian disaster. British and American destroyers were common on the Chinese coast and rivers, even supplying landing parties to protect colonial interests.

By World War II, the threat had evolved once again. Submarines were more effective, and aircraft had become important weapons of naval warfare; once again the early-war fleet destroyers were ill-equipped for combating these new targets. They were fitted with new light antiaircraft guns, radar, and forward-launched ASW weapons, in addition to their existing dual-purpose guns, depth charges, and torpedoes. Increasing size allowed improved internal arrangement of propulsion machinery with compartmentation, so ships were less likely to be sunk by a single hit. In most cases torpedo and/or dual-purpose gun armament was reduced to accommodate new anti-air and anti-submarine weapons. By this time the destroyers had become large, multi-purpose vessels, expensive targets in their own right. As a result, casualties on destroyers were among the highest.  In the US Navy, particularly in World War II, destroyers became known as tin cans due to their light armor compared to battleships and cruisers.

The need for large numbers of antisubmarine ships led to the introduction of smaller and cheaper specialized antisubmarine warships called corvettes and frigates by the Royal Navy and destroyer escorts by the USN. A similar programme was belatedly started by the Japanese (see ). These ships had the size and displacement of the original TBDs from which the contemporary destroyer had evolved.

Post-World War II

Some conventional destroyers completed in the late 1940s and 1950s were built on wartime experience. These vessels were significantly larger than wartime ships and had fully automatic main guns, unit machinery, radar, sonar, and antisubmarine weapons such as the squid mortar. Examples include the British , US , and the Soviet s.

Some World War II–vintage ships were modernized for antisubmarine warfare, and to extend their service lives, to avoid having to build (expensive) brand-new ships. Examples include the US FRAM I programme and the British Type 15 frigates converted from fleet destroyers.

The advent of surface-to-air missiles and surface-to-surface missiles, such as the Exocet, in the early 1960s changed naval warfare. Guided missile destroyers (DDG in the US Navy) were developed to carry these weapons and protect the fleet from air, submarine, and surface threats. Examples include the Soviet , the British , and the US .

The 21st century destroyers tend to display features such as large, slab sides without complicated corners and crevices to keep the radar cross-section small, vertical launch systems to carry a large number of missiles at high readiness to fire, and helicopter flight decks and hangars.

Operators
  operates four s and a single Type 42 destroyer used as transport ship.
  operates three s.

  operates seven Renhai-class destroyers, two Luyang I-class destroyers, six Luyang II-class destroyers, 24 Luyang III-class destroyers and two Luzhou-class destroyers. China also operates two Luhu-class destroyers, one Luhai-class destroyer and four -class destroyers that are of older models.
  (Taiwan) operates four s, purchased from the United States.
  operates a single Z-class destroyer for training use. 
  operates eight FREMM multipurpose frigates and two s. The French Navy does not use the term "destroyer" but rather "first-rate frigate" to these ship types, but they are marked with the NATO "D" hull code which places them in the destroyer type, as opposed to "F" for frigate.
  operates three s and four s. These ships are officially classified as frigates by Germany, but regarded as destroyers internationally due to size and capability.

  operates two s, three s, three , and three  destroyers. 
  operates three s. These ships are classified as destroyers by Iran, but internationally regarded as light frigates.

  operates two s and two Orizzonte-class destroyers.
  operates two , two , four , two , four , five , nine , eight , and two s, along with six s. Japan also operates two  and two  helicopter destroyers, internationally regarded as helicopter carriers.
  operates three , six  and three  destroyers.
  operates four s. These ships are classified as frigates by the Netherlands, but regarded as destroyers internationally due to size and capability.
  operates four s. These ships are officially classified as frigates by Norway, but are regarded both internationally and by their officers as destroyers.
  operates a single  purchased from the United Kingdom.
  operates . This ship was classified as a destroyer from 1990 to 2001, when she was reclassified as a frigate. No official reason was given for this and there was no change in armament or capability, thus remaining in the destroyer type. 
  The Russian Navy operates two  and eight  destroyers.
  operates five s. These ships are officially classified as a frigates by Spain, but due to their size and capabilities are regarded internationally as destroyers.
  operates a single  purchased from the United States for training use.

  operates six Type 45 or Daring-class stealth destroyers. 
  operates 70 active  guided missile destroyers (DDGs) of a planned class of 89, and also has two active  destroyer of a planned class of three, all .

Former operators

  lost its entire navy upon the Empire's collapse following World War I.
  lost its entire navy upon its conquest by the Bolsheviks in 1921.
  sold its two  and s to Peru in 1933, to prevent their capture by the Soviet Union.
  transferred its only  back to Japan in 1942.
  decommissioned its only  in 1963.
  decommissioned its last  in 1965.
  decommissioned its last  in 1967.
  decommissioned its last Z-class destroyer in 1972.
  decommissioned its H-class destroyer in 1972.
  transferred its remaining  to The Philippines in 1975 following the Fall of Saigon.
  decommissioned its last W-class destroyer in 1976.
  decommissioned its only destroyer,  in 1980.
  decommissioned both its  and four s in 1982 following defense reviews.
  decommissioned both its s and its lone  in 1986.
  decommissioned its last  in 1991.
  lone  was destroyed by a fire in 1992.
  decommissioned its lone  in 1994.
  decommissioned its lone  in 1997.
  decommissioned its last  in 2000.
  decommissioned its lone  in 2003.
  decommissioned its last  in 2004.
  decommissioned its last s in 2005.
  decommissioned its last  in 2006.
  decommissioned its last  in 2007.
  decommissioned its last Garcia-class destroyer escort in 2008.
  decommissioned its last  in 2011.
  decommissioned its last  in 2015.
  decommissioned its last  in 2017.
  decommissioned its last  in 2018.

Future development

 plans to build 7,000-ton destroyers after the delivery of the new frigates, and TKMS presented to the Navy its most modern 7,200-ton MEKO A-400 air defense destroyer, an updated version of the German F-125-class frigates. The similarities between the projects and the high rate of commonality between requirements were also crucial for the consortium's victory.
 is adding six more Type 052D destroyer and sixteen more Type 055 destroyer class ships to its navy.
 is building five new Amiral Ronarc'h-class destroyers (classed as "first rank frigates" in the French Navy).
 Six multi-mission surface combat ships are planned under the name 'Mehrzweckkampfschiff 180' (MKS 180), which will have destroyer-size and corresponding capabilities (Length: 163 m, displacement: 10,400 tons)
  has ordered three Frégate de défense et d'intervention (with an option on a fourth) from France.
 is building four s, of which two have been commissioned. The nation has also begun development of its Next Generation Destroyer (NGD), also referred to as Project 18-class destroyers.
 is currently building 1-2 s.
 is currently researching development into their new DDX project to replace their Durand da le Penne-class destroyers.
 Is developing plans for its DDR Destroyer Revolution Project.
 has begun development of its KDX-IIA destroyers. These ships are to be a subclass of South Korea's s. The first unit is expected to enter service in 2019. Additionally, s are being built.
 has begun development of its . Design work was ongoing as of 2020.
 is currently developing its TF2000-class destroyer as the largest part of the MILGEM project. A total of seven ships will be constructed and will specialise in anti-air warfare.
 is in the early stages of developing a Type 83 destroyer design after the unveiling of these plans in the 2021 defence white paper. The class is projected to replace the current Type 45 destroyer fleet beginning in the latter 2030s.
, currently has 19 additional Arleigh Burke destroyers planned or under construction. The new ships will be the upgraded "flight III" version. The United States has also started development of its DDG(X) next-generation destroyer project. Construction of the first ship is expected to start in 2028.

Preserved destroyers 
A number of countries have destroyers preserved as museum ships. These include:
  in Sydney, New South Wales.
 BNS Bauru, formerly  in Rio de Janeiro, Brazil.
  in Hamilton, Ontario.
  in Qingdao, China.
  in Rushan, China
  in Dalian, China
  in Wuhan, China
  in Yinchuan, China
  in Shanghai, China
  in Qingdao, China
  in Taizhou, China
  in Nanchang, China
  in Tianjin, China
 , in Guizhou, China
  in Shandong, China
  in Shandong, China
  has been slated for preservation in China
  has been slated for preservation in China
 ARC Boyaca (DE-16), formerly  in Guatape, Colombia.
  in Nantes, France.
  in Wilhelmshaven, Germany.
 HS Velos (D-16), formerly  in Palaio Faliro, Greece.
  in Sangley Point, Philippines
  in Gdynia, Poland. The oldest preserved destroyer in the world.
 Russian destroyer Bespokoynyy in Kronstadt, Russia
 Russian destroyer Smetlivy in Sevastopol, Crimea
 ROKS Jeong Ju (DD-925), formerly  in Dangjin, South Korea.
  in Gothenburg, Sweden.
 ROCS Te Yang (DDG-925), formerly  in Tainan City, Taiwan
 TCG Gayret (D352), formerly  in Izmit, Turkey.
  in Chatham, Kent.
  in Boston, Massachusetts.
  in Buffalo, New York.
  in Baton Rouge, Louisiana.
  in Albany, New York.
  in Galveston, Texas.
  in Jacksonville, Florida.
  in Bremerton, Washington.
  in Mount Pleasant, South Carolina.
  in Bay City, Michigan.
  in Fall River, Massachusetts.

Former museums

  was on display in Bridgewater, Nova Scotia from 1994 to 2011. Later scrapped due to her deteriorating condition.
 IJN Shiga was on display in Chiba City, Japan from 1964 to 1998 when she was scrapped due to her deteriorating condition.
 ROKS Kang Won (DD-922) was on display from 2000 to 2016, when she was closed due to her deteriorating condition, and later scrapped.
 ROKS Jeong Buk (DD-916) was on display in Gangneung, South Korea from 1999 to 2021, when she was scrapped.
 ORP Burza was on display in Gdynia, Poland from 1951 to 1977, until she was replaced in the role by Blyskawica due to her deteriorating condition, and later scrapped.
  was on display in Washington, D. C. from 1984 to 2015, until she was closed to make room for a bridge expansion. She is currently in lay up in Philadelphia awaiting scrapping.

See also
 List of destroyer classes
 United States Navy 1975 ship reclassification
 Bombardment of Cherbourg
 List of destroyers of the Second World War

Notes

References

Further reading
 Evans, David C. Kaigun: Strategy, Tactics, and Technology in the Imperial Japanese Navy, 1887–1941, Mark R. Peattie. Naval Institute Press, Annapolis, Maryland 
 Gardiner, Robert (Editor). Conway's All the World's Fighting Ships (1860–1905): Naval Institute Press, 1985.
 Gove, Philip Babock (Editor in Chief). Webster's Third New International Dictionary of the English Language Unabridged. (2002) Merriam-Webster Inc., Publishers, Massachusetts, USA.
 Grant, R. Captain. Before Port Arthur in a Destroyer; The Personal Diary of a Japanese Naval Officer. London, John Murray; first and second editions published in 1907.
 Howe, Christopher. Origins of Japanese Trade Supremacy: Development and Technology in Asia from 1540 to the Pacific War, The University of Chicago Press, 
 Jentschura, Hansgeorg. Warships of the Imperial Japanese Navy, 1869–1945. United States Naval Institute, Annapolis, Maryland, 1977. .
 Lyon, David, The First Destroyers. Chatham Publishing, 1 & 2 Faulkner's Alley, Cowcross St. London, Great Britain; 1996. .
 Sanders, Michael S. (2001) The Yard: Building a Destroyer at the Bath Iron Works, HarperCollins, 
 Simpson, Richard V. Building The Mosquito Fleet, The US Navy's First Torpedo Boats. Arcadia Publishing, (2001); Charleston, South Carolina, USA. .
 Preston, Anthony. Destroyers, Bison Books (London) 1977. 
 Van der Vat, Dan. The Atlantic Campaign''.
 Navy Designates Next-Generation Zumwalt Destroyer

External links

 
Ship types